The 1954 NCAA Track and Field Championships were contested June 11−12 at the 33rd annual NCAA-sanctioned track meet to determine the individual and team national champions of men's collegiate track and field in the United States. This year's events were hosted by the University of Michigan at Ferry Field in Ann Arbor.

USC won their sixth consecutive team national championship, the Trojans' 18th title in program history.

Team Result
Note: Top 10 finishers only
(H) = Hosts

See also
 NCAA Men's Outdoor Track and Field Championship
 1953 NCAA Men's Cross Country Championships

References

NCAA Men's Outdoor Track and Field Championship
NCAA Track and Field
NCAA
NCAA Track and Field Championships